The Karmali is an artisan tribe of Jharkhand. It is composed of blacksmiths. They are mainly concentrated in Ramgarh, Bokaro, Hazaribagh, Giridih and Ranchi district of Jharkhand and sizable population also found in West Bengal and Assam. They speak Khotta language in their home and Hindi language with society. As per 1981 census their population in the state was 38,651. They are considered as Scheduled Tribe in West Bengal and Jharkhand.

Notes

References 

Tribes of Jharkhand
Tribes of West Bengal